Amethyst Journey is the debut studio album by Alaska and Jeremy, a musical duo featuring Alaska Thunderfuck and Jeremy Mikush, released by Producer Entertainment Group on August 17, 2018.

Promotion

The album's lead single, "Aliens", was also released on August 17, 2018. The song's music video features Alaska in a field surrounded by cows, and the duo putting an alien into drag.

Reception
The album has been described as "genderqueer hippie" and "folk music-based lullaby written for the people of earth". The Villager Victor O. described the album as "a fresh, contemplative, and emotionally intelligent work that represents a change of tone in the dynamic duo's ever-evolving artistic voice", and Them. called Amethyst Journey "mellow".

Track listing
 "Aliens" – 3:59
 "Truth in the Light" – 3:21
 "So Far Gone" – 5:01
 "The Wind" – 1:12
 "Son of a Mother" – 3:31
 "The End of the World" – 2:54
 "Ascension" – 3:20
 "At the End of the Day" – 1:37

References

External links
  (August 17, 2018), Billboard
 Alaska and Jeremy Talk “Amethyst Journey”, the State of Drag, and What Makes A Relationship by Michael Cook (September 18, 2018), Get Out!

2018 debut albums
Alaska Thunderfuck albums
Collaborative albums
Producer Entertainment Group albums
Folk albums by American artists